Cirrula gigantea is a species of shore flies in the family Ephydridae.

Distribution
United States, Canada.

References

Ephydridae
Insects described in 1915
Diptera of North America
Taxa named by Ezra Townsend Cresson